Nicholas Edward Foles (born January 20, 1989) is an American football quarterback for the Indianapolis Colts of the National Football League (NFL). He played college football at Arizona and was selected in the third round of the 2012 NFL Draft by the Philadelphia Eagles. Initially a backup, Foles was named the team's starter midway through his rookie season. He maintained his starting position through 2013, during which he set the NFL season record for the best touchdown–interception ratio and posted a perfect passer rating in a game. His success led the Eagles to a division title, while also earning him Pro Bowl honors. After an unsuccessful 2014 season, Foles was traded to the St. Louis Rams, where he was released after struggling in his one season. He spent the following year as a backup for the Kansas City Chiefs.

Foles returned to the Eagles in 2017 as Carson Wentz's backup, but was promoted to starter when Wentz was injured near the end of the season. He led the Eagles throughout their playoff run, which culminated with the franchise's first Super Bowl title in Super Bowl LII and earned the game's MVP award. Initially returning to his backup role for 2018, Foles guided Philadelphia on another postseason run after Wentz was again lost to injury. Foles opted out of his contract with the Eagles to join the Jacksonville Jaguars in 2019, but suffered an injury during the season opener that caused him to miss most of the year. He was traded in 2020 to the Chicago Bears, where he spent two seasons alternating as a backup and starter. After being released by the Bears in 2022, Foles signed with the Colts in a backup role.

Early years
Foles was born and raised in Austin, Texas, the son of restaurateurs Larry and Melissa Foles. He graduated in 2007 from Westlake High School.

A two-year starter for the football team, Foles threw for 5,658 yards and 56 touchdowns, breaking most school records previously held by Foles' future NFL opponent, Drew Brees.

Foles also excelled at basketball, where he started three years, twice received team MVP honors, and was recruited by Georgetown, Baylor, and Texas. He also played high school football with Justin Tucker, kicker for the Baltimore Ravens, and Kyle Adams, a former tight end for the Tampa Bay Buccaneers and Chicago Bears.

Foles originally committed to Arizona State, but later decided to attend Michigan State. He ultimately transferred to the University of Arizona.

College career

Foles attended Michigan State for one year. He appeared in a game against Alabama–Birmingham, where he completed 5 of 8 passes for 57 yards.

After one year at Michigan State, Foles transferred to the University of Arizona and had to redshirt his 2008 freshman season.

After quarterback Willie Tuitama graduated, Foles competed with expected successor Matt Scott, who got the nod after spring practice because the coaches believed he could run effectively as well as pass. Despite victories against Central Michigan and Northern Arizona, Scott struggled against Iowa and the next week was benched in favor of Foles. In Corvallis, Foles led the Wildcats to a victory against Oregon State. He started the rest of the season, completing 260 of 409 pass attempts for 2,486 yards, 19 touchdowns, and nine interceptions.

As a redshirt junior in 2010, Foles was the unquestioned starter. Foles led the Wildcats to a 7–1 start, including a victory against #9 Iowa on national television. Foles led the game-winning drive that ended with a touchdown pass to Bug Wright. A knee injury in the Washington State game sidelined him for two games, but Foles finished off his junior year with 3,191 yards, 20 touchdowns, and 10 interceptions.

During the 2011 season, Foles completed 387 of 560 passes for 4,334 yards and 28 touchdowns. He ranked first in the Pac-12 Conference and fifth among all NCAA Division I FBS players with an average of 352.58 yards of total offense per game. He also ranked second in the Pac-12 and 20th among all FBS players in total passing yardage.

Foles graduated from the University of Arizona with a degree in communications.

Statistics

Professional career

Philadelphia Eagles

2012 season
Foles was selected by the Philadelphia Eagles in the third round as the 88th overall pick in the 2012 NFL Draft. He signed a four-year contract with the team on May 21, 2012. Despite speculation that Foles would start the Eagles' Monday Night Football game against the New Orleans Saints on November 5 (Week 9), Eagles coach Andy Reid stated that Vick would start that game. The following week against the division rival Dallas Cowboys, after Vick left the game in the second quarter with concussion symptoms, Foles made his NFL debut. Foles threw his first career touchdown pass to wide receiver Jeremy Maclin for 44 yards and finished with 22 completed passes out of 32 attempts for 219 yards, one touchdown, and one interception. With Philadelphia behind 31–23 in the last minute, Foles lost the ball as he was sacked, and Jason Hatcher of the Cowboys recovered the ball in the end zone for a touchdown. Vick was eventually ruled out of the following game against the Washington Redskins in Week 11, and Foles made his first career start. Philadelphia lost to the Redskins 31–6, and Foles was 21-for-47 in passing 204 yards with no touchdowns and two interceptions.

On Monday, December 3, 2012, Eagles coach Andy Reid announced that Foles would start for the rest of the year, regardless of when Vick returned from a concussion. The following Week 14 game on December 9, Foles earned his first win as a starter in the Eagles' 23–21 win over the Tampa Bay Buccaneers. With two seconds remaining on the clock and Philadelphia down 21–16 at the Bucs' one-yard line, Foles threw a 1-yard pass to Jeremy Maclin for the game-winning touchdown as time expired. Foles completed 32-of-51 passes for 381 yards and two touchdowns – both coming in the final four minutes. He also had 27 rushing yards and a rushing touchdown. On December 23, Foles broke his hand against the Redskins, and was replaced by Vick in the season finale against the New York Giants. On December 26, Foles was placed on injured reserve.

2013 season
Going into training camp, new head coach Chip Kelly announced that Foles would compete with Vick and newly drafted rookie Matt Barkley for the Eagles starting quarterback job in the 2013 season. Going into preseason, it became clear that the job was a two-way battle between Foles and Vick. Foles played average during preseason while Vick excelled past him. On August 20, it was announced that Vick would start the season and Foles would be the backup.

Foles saw his first game in action during a Week 4 loss against the Denver Broncos. He completed 3 out of 4 attempted passes for a total of 49 yards and one touchdown, with no interceptions.

On October 6, Foles entered the game against the New York Giants in the second quarter, after Vick suffered a hamstring injury. Foles completed 16 of 25 passes for 197 yards and 2 touchdowns, leading the Eagles to a 36–21 win over the Giants. Later in the week, it was announced that Foles would get the start in Week 6 against the 0–4 Tampa Bay Buccaneers, after Vick was declared unable to start due to his injury. In his Week 6 start on October 13, Foles had one of the best starts of his career, completing 22 of 31 passes for 296 yards and 4 total touchdowns (3 passing, 1 rushing) in a 31–20 win over the Bucs, a performance that earned him NFC Offensive Player of the Week.

On October 15, Vick announced that he needed another week of rehab before he was able to start again, making Foles the starter for the Week 7 matchup against the Dallas Cowboys for the division lead. However, against the Cowboys, Foles completed only 11 of 29 passes for a total of 80 yards, with no touchdowns. In that same game, Foles left in the 4th quarter after suffering a head injury, and was replaced by rookie Matt Barkley. Barkley did not perform well either, throwing 3 interceptions. The Eagles went on to lose 17–3 to the Cowboys thus dropping to 3–4 on the season and 1 game out of first place. The next day, Foles was diagnosed with a concussion and ruled out of any participation in the Week 8 matchup against the Giants on medical grounds.

Foles was given his third start of the season for Week 9 against the Oakland Raiders. Foles threw for seven touchdowns, tying a record held by six other quarterbacks (held by eight QB's as of 2020). Foles is one of three quarterbacks to throw seven touchdowns and no interceptions; he also amassed a perfect passer rating (158.3), having thrown more touchdown passes than incompletions. Foles was awarded his second NFC Offensive Player of the Week Award of the season for his performance against the Raiders.

In Week 10 of the regular season, Foles played in his sixth game of the season (four starts) against the Green Bay Packers. Coming into the game, the Eagles had lost to the Packers on the last three occasions the teams had met (including post season). Foles completed 12 out of 18 passes for a total of 228 yards, 3 touchdowns, and no interceptions. His passer rating was extremely high for the second consecutive week, finishing at 149.3 and becoming the first quarterback in NFL history to post passer ratings above 149 in consecutive weeks. Foles carried 8 times during the game, including a 16 yard long run, finishing the game with 38 yards total and one fumble lost. The Eagles won the game 27–13 and moved to 5–5.

Foles continued as the starting quarterback in Week 11 of the regular season against the Washington Redskins at home. For the sixth time this season, Foles’ passer rating eclipsed 100, as he completed 17 of his 26 attempts for 298 yards with no touchdowns and no interceptions. Foles rushed the ball on 9 occasions during the game, ending with 47 total yards and a rushing touchdown. He led the Eagles to a 24–0 lead at the end of the third quarter, before a comeback from the Redskins meant the game finished 24–16. The win moved the Eagles to an overall record of 6–5–0 and first position in the NFC East. The Eagles had not won at Lincoln Financial Field in 413 days since defeating the New York Giants on September 30, 2012; ending a streak of 10 consecutive home defeats. On November 27, Foles was named the NFC Player of the Month for his play during the month of November.

The Eagles did not have a game scheduled for Week 12 of the regular season as they went into a bye week. The team returned to action on Sunday, December 1, for a home game against the Arizona Cardinals. Following their bye week, the Eagles had slipped into 2nd place in the divisional standings behind fierce rivals the Cowboys. Foles was named as the starting quarterback for the remainder of the season, a decision which Vick (who began the year as the number one quarterback) fully agreed with.

For the seventh time this season, Foles's passer rating eclipsed 100, as he completed 21 of 34 attempted passes for a total of 237 yards, with 3 touchdowns and no interceptions. He also rushed for 22 yards on 9 attempts and fumbled on one occasion, although this was recovered by his teammates – and did not result in a turnover. Following a closely contested game, the Eagles held on to win 24–21 despite a fourth quarter comeback by Carson Palmer. Foles set a team record for most passes without an interception (233), breaking Michael Vick's mark of 224 set in 2010. He also moved within one touchdown pass of the record 20 straight touchdown passes set by Peyton Manning and zero interceptions to start a season before throwing an interception in a blizzard game in Philadelphia against the Detroit Lions in which the Eagles won 34–20. The win took the Eagles to an overall record of 8–5 and surpassed Dallas for the number one spot in the NFC East. A week later in Minnesota, the team's five game winning streak was snapped with a loss to Minnesota. However, Foles again had another impressive game with yet another passer rating over 100 and three more touchdowns and only his second interception of the season. The following week, the Eagles defeated the Chicago Bears 54–11, which saw another passer rating over 100 and a completion of 84.0% of his passes, a career-high. Foles helped lead the Eagles to their first NFC East division title in three years by beating the Cowboys in the regular season finale. Foles had his ninth game with a passer rating over 100.

Foles finished the 2013 regular season with 27 touchdown passes and only 2 interceptions, just behind Tom Brady's 2016 record of 28 touchdown passes and 2 interceptions for the best TD-INT ratio in NFL history, and a season leading 119.0 passer rating and third in NFL history trailing only to Aaron Rodgers' 122.5 rating in 2011 and Peyton Manning's 121.1 rating in 2004. Foles led the Eagles to a playoff berth, the first since 2010. Hosting the New Orleans Saints in the playoffs at Lincoln Financial Field, the Eagles lost on a last-minute field goal as the game ended at 26–24. Foles threw for 195 yards, two touchdowns, and no interceptions, for a passer rating of 105.0, in his postseason debut. Foles was awarded the "NFL Greatness on the Road" award for his seven touchdown, perfect game performance against the Oakland Raiders during a road game in 2013. When including postseason games, Nick Foles maintains the single season record for TD-INT ratio at 14.5–1, which he achieved by posting 27 touchdown passes in the 2013 regular season, two touchdown passes in the 2013 postseason, and a total of just two interceptions.

Foles was also assigned to the 2014 Pro Bowl as an alternate and was drafted by Team Sanders. Despite losing the game, Foles went 7 for 10 for 89 yards and a go-ahead touchdown. Foles won the Pro Bowl Offensive MVP award, which included a new GMC truck.

2014 season
Going into 2014, Chip Kelly had released Foles' top receiver, DeSean Jackson, but Jeremy Maclin, who had good chemistry with Foles in 2012, returned from an ACL tear and had a career season, gaining 702 yards and six touchdowns with Foles as quarterback, finishing with 1,318 yards and ten scores. He was also aided by rookie receiver Jordan Matthews, second year tight end Zach Ertz, and veteran running back Darren Sproles.

Foles and the Eagles kicked off their 2014 season with a Week 1 home matchup against the Jacksonville Jaguars. Foles started the game poorly, losing 2 fumbles and throwing an interception in the first half. Foles only lost two fumbles and threw two interceptions the entire 2013 season. The Eagles defense also performed poorly, as they trailed 17–0 after the first half. However, the Eagles roared back in the second half, scoring 34 unanswered points to defeat the Jags 34–17. Overall, Foles completed 24 of 45 passes for 332 yards and two touchdowns, along with the three turnovers.

Foles led the Eagles to a 30–27 win over the Colts after trailing by as much as 20–6 early in the third. Foles went 21–37, passing for 331 yards, one touchdown, and one interception during the game.

Foles played his best game of the season in a 37–34 win over the division rival Washington Redskins. Foles fought off the slow starts of games past, a strong Washington defensive front seven, and a brutal blindside hit from Washington defensive lineman Chris Baker which resulted in a major brawl between both teams and causing Eagles left tackle Jason Peters, the strongest player in their line, and Baker to be ejected from the game. Foles finished the game completing 66 percent of his passes, going for 325 yards and three touchdowns. In Week 8, Foles set a franchise record for most completions in a game with 36 and threw a career-high 62 times in a close loss to the Arizona Cardinals, finishing with 411 passing yards and 2 touchdowns. The following week in a game against the Houston Texans, Foles left the game during the first half with a broken collarbone, which led to Foles being put on injured reserve, ending his 2014 season. Mark Sanchez finished out the season as the Eagles starting quarterback.

After a league-best 27–2 TD-INT ratio in 2013, Foles finished the season with 2,163 yards in 8 games, and a 13–10 TD-INT ratio. He also fumbled 4 times, only recovering it once. Overall, all of his stats were narrowly beaten by Sanchez, including turnovers (14–11 TD–INT ratio). He led the team to a 6–2 record as starter, first place in the NFC East and second place in the NFC.

St. Louis Rams

On March 10, 2015, the Eagles traded Foles, a 2015 fourth-round pick, and a 2016 second-round pick to the St. Louis Rams in exchange for Sam Bradford and a 2015 fifth-round pick. Foles signed a two-year, $24.5 million extension with the Rams on August 7, 2015. Foles's first game with the team came against the division rival Seattle Seahawks, who had the league's No. 1 defense in 2013 and 2014. Foles went 18 for 27 and passed for 297 yards in the game, and his lone passing touchdown came with 53 seconds left, bringing the game into overtime. He also ran for 11 yards and 1 touchdown, which put the Rams in the lead in the middle of the second quarter. In overtime, Foles threw a 22-yard pass to wide receiver Stedman Bailey, which set up the Rams' game-winning field goal over the defending NFC Champions.

Following the dramatic win, Foles struggled against his former divisional rival, the Washington Redskins. Although he didn't turn the ball over, he only completed 17 passes out of 32 for 150 yards and the Rams lone touchdown as they lost 24–10. Foles' accuracy improved the following week, going 19–28 for 197 yards, but he threw no touchdowns and his first interception as a Ram against the Pittsburgh Steelers, and the Rams dropped to 1–2. Following the two losses, Foles bounced back, going 16–24 for 3 touchdowns and no turnovers to hand the 3–0 Arizona Cardinals their first loss of the season. After that game, Foles' problems with turnovers from 2014 started to show, as he completed 11 passes out of 30 for 141 yards, 1 touchdown, and a career-high 4 interceptions against the Green Bay Packers. On November 16, Foles was benched in favor of Case Keenum. He won his starting job back two weeks later after Keenum was out with a concussion, but his struggles worsened. In a loss against Cincinnati Bengals, he went 30–46 for 228 yards (his second highest total of the year) and 3 interceptions, and followed it up by going 15/35 for 146 yards and 1 interception in a 27–3 loss to the Arizona Cardinals. Foles was again benched after Keenum returned from his concussion.

Upset that the now-Los Angeles Rams drafted quarterback Jared Goff as the first overall pick of the 2016 NFL draft, Foles requested and was granted a release on July 27, 2016.

Kansas City Chiefs
After reportedly contemplating retirement after his rough season with the Rams, Foles signed with the Kansas City Chiefs on August 3, 2016. It was a one-year deal worth $1.75 million and included a second-year option for 2017, worth between $6.75 million and $16 million depending on his performance during the Chiefs' 2016 season. In Week 8 at Indianapolis Colts after Alex Smith left the game with a concussion, Foles took over for the remainder of the game, and finished with 223 yards and two touchdowns. The Chiefs announced that Foles would start in Week 9 against the Jacksonville Jaguars as Smith was still recovering from injury. Foles won the game over the Jaguars, 19–14, and finished 20–33 with 187 yards and a touchdown. The next day, Smith was announced to start Week 10.

On March 9, 2017, the Chiefs declined a second-year option on his contract, making him a free agent.

Return to the Philadelphia Eagles

2017 season: Super Bowl LII MVP 
On March 13, 2017, Foles signed a two-year contract to return to the Philadelphia Eagles to back up 2016 first-round pick Carson Wentz. During Week 14 against the Los Angeles Rams, Foles came in relief of Wentz, who left the game with a torn ACL. Foles completed 6 of 10 passes for 42 yards as the Eagles won 43–35, clinching their first division title since 2013. On December 11, 2017, head coach Doug Pederson announced that Foles would be the starter after Wentz was ruled out for the season. Starting his first game of the season in Week 15, Foles threw for 237 yards and 4 touchdowns in a 34–29 victory over the New York Giants. The next week, he helped the Eagles defeat the Raiders in Week 16 by a score of 19–10. He was 19-of-38 for 163 passing yards, one touchdown, and one interception. He had a limited role to avoid injury in the regular season finale, a 6–0 loss to the Dallas Cowboys.

On January 13, 2018, the Eagles defeated the Atlanta Falcons 15–10 in the NFC Divisional playoff game, with Foles completing 23 of 30 passes for 246 yards. This was the Eagles' first playoff victory in nine seasons. On January 21, 2018, the Eagles defeated the Minnesota Vikings, 38–7, in the NFC Championship Game, with Foles going 26 of 33 for 352 yards and 3 touchdowns. The Vikings were 3-point favorites with the league's top-ranked defense entering the game.

In Super Bowl LII, Foles caught a touchdown pass from tight end Trey Burton, becoming the first player to both throw and catch a touchdown pass in a Super Bowl, while also being the third quarterback to catch a pass in a Super Bowl, after John Elway in Super Bowl XXII and Jim Kelly in Super Bowl XXVI. The Eagles defeated the New England Patriots 41–33 to win their first Super Bowl. Foles completed 28 of 43 passes for 373 yards, 3 passing touchdowns, and 1 interception, and was named the Most Valuable Player of the game.

2018 season 
On April 20, 2018, Foles and the Eagles agreed on a new revised contract that would contain a $2 million bonus and millions of dollars in incentives if he were to become the starting quarterback, as well as a mutual option for 2019.

On September 3, 2018, Foles was named the starter for the season opener against the Atlanta Falcons, as Wentz was not yet medically cleared for contact. Foles led the Eagles to a 1–1 record through two games, with 1 touchdown pass, 1 interception, and a 78.9 passer rating, before Wentz returned as the starter for Week 3.

On December 12, 2018, it was announced that Wentz would probably sit out due to a back injury in the Week 15 game against the Los Angeles Rams, thus giving Foles his third start of the season. Foles started as expected and threw for 277 yards with 24 completions on 31 pass attempts and one interception in a 30–23 win. In Week 16, Foles started against the Houston Texans, and threw for 471 yards with 35 completions on 49 pass attempts and four touchdowns with one interception in a 32–30 victory, a performance which earned him the NFC Offensive Player of the Week award. The 471 yards broke Donovan McNabb's record for most passing yards by an Eagles quarterback in a single game.

On December 30, in a Week 17 game with the Washington Redskins, Foles tied the NFL record for consecutive pass completions with 25 in a row, while the Eagles clinched a playoff berth. In the Wild Card playoff game against the Chicago Bears at Soldier Field, Foles led the Eagles on a game-winning touchdown drive that culminated with a pass to Golden Tate with 56 seconds left in the game as the Eagles won 16–15 and advanced to play the top-seeded New Orleans Saints in the Divisional Round. Against the Saints, Foles threw a touchdown pass on the game's opening drive, and scored another on a quarterback sneak in the first quarter, but the Saints came back to take a 20–14 lead. Late in the game, on what would turn out to be the Eagles last offensive possession, Foles threw a pass that went through receiver Alshon Jeffery's hands and was intercepted by Saints cornerback Marshon Lattimore, which allowed the Saints to run out the clock and win.

On January 19, 2019, the Eagles announced they would pay Foles the $1 million bonus for playing 33 percent of the Eagles' snaps while the team made the playoffs, even though Foles missed the mark by four plays (32.69 percent).

On February 5, 2019, the Eagles announced that they would pick up the $20 million option on Foles' contract. The same day, however, Foles informed the Eagles that he would void the option, making him a free agent.

Jacksonville Jaguars

On March 13, 2019, Foles signed a four-year contract worth $88 million with the Jacksonville Jaguars. $50.1 million was guaranteed and could pay up to $102 million with incentives.

In Week 1 of the 2019 season, Foles started the game against the Kansas City Chiefs completing 5 of 8 passes for 75 yards and a touchdown, but suffered a shoulder injury in the first quarter and was ruled out the rest of the game. Later that day, it was revealed that Foles had suffered a broken left clavicle and underwent surgery the next day. He was designated for return from injured reserve on October 23, 2019, and began practicing with the team. On November 5, Foles was activated and was named the starting quarterback over rookie Gardner Minshew, who had been filling in for him as the starter. Foles made his return from injury in Week 11 against the Indianapolis Colts. In the game, Foles threw for 296 yards, two touchdowns, and one interception in the 33–13 loss. In Week 13 against the Tampa Bay Buccaneers, Foles completed 7 of 14 passes for just 93 yards with one interception and no touchdowns (and also losing 2 fumbles) before being benched for Minshew after the Jaguars were losing by a score of 25–0 at halftime. Without Foles, the Jaguars went on to lose the game 28–11. Days after the game, head coach Doug Marrone announced that Foles would be benched and Minshew would retake the starting job. Foles would finish the 2019 season with only four starts in four games, throwing for three touchdowns and two interceptions.

Chicago Bears
Foles was traded to the Chicago Bears in exchange for a compensatory fourth-round 2020 NFL Draft pick on March 31, 2020. He competed with Mitchell Trubisky for the starting quarterback position during Training Camp, eventually losing and becoming the backup.

After not seeing action in the first two games of the 2020 season, Foles replaced a struggling Trubisky in the third quarter against the Atlanta Falcons as the Bears trailed by 16 points. Foles completed 16 of 29 passes for 188 yards, three touchdowns, and an interception as he led a 30–26 comeback victory. A day after the win, Foles was officially named the starter.

In Week 5 against the Tampa Bay Buccaneers on Thursday Night Football, Foles threw for 243 yards, one touchdown, and one interception during the 20–19 win. It was Foles' first win as the Bears' starting quarterback. In Week 9 against the Tennessee Titans, Foles threw for 335 yards and two touchdowns during the 24–17 loss.

In Week 10 against the Minnesota Vikings on Monday Night Football, Foles threw for 106 yards and an interception before suffering a hip injury that required him to be carted off the field after being slammed to the turf late in the fourth quarter. He was replaced by his backup Tyler Bray with 34 seconds left during the 19–13 loss. With Foles recovering from his injury, Trubisky returned to the starting position for the following game against the Green Bay Packers. Once again the backup, Foles did not see action until Week 16 in Jacksonville when he took over during garbage time in the fourth quarter; he mostly handed off the ball and his lone pass attempt was incomplete as the Bears defeated his former team 41–17.

After being the third string quarterback throughout most of the 2021 season, Foles made his first start in Week 16 against the Seattle Seahawks due to Justin Fields and Andy Dalton dealing with injuries. Foles threw for 250 yards and the game winning touchdown to Jimmy Graham in the 25–24 win.

Foles was released on May 1, 2022.

Indianapolis Colts
Foles signed a two-year contract with the Indianapolis Colts on May 23, 2022. 

After spending the first fifteen weeks as a backup, only appearing on two snaps, he was named the Colts' starter for their Week 16 game against the Los Angeles Chargers. In the game, Foles threw for 143 yards and three interceptions in the 20–3 loss. Despite the poor performance, Foles was again named the starter for their Week 17 game against the New York Giants, but he was injured during the game after a sack by Kayvon Thibodeaux in the second quarter in the 38–10 loss.

NFL career statistics

Regular season

Postseason

Career awards and highlights
 Super Bowl champion (LII) 
 Super Bowl MVP  (LII)
 Pro Bowl selection (2013)
 Pro Bowl Offensive MVP (2013)
 NFL Passer rating leader (2013)
 NFL record seven touchdown passes in a game (tied)
 NFL record highest completion percentage in a game with 7 TD passes: 78.57 (2013)
 NFL record most passing touchdowns (7) with a perfect passer rating (158.3) in a game (2013)
 NFL record best touchdown pass–interception differential in a single game: 7 TDs, 0 INTs (2013) (tied)
 Highest career passer rating in Eagles franchise history: 92.9
NFL record most consecutive pass completions (25) (tied with Philip Rivers and Ryan Tannehill)
NFL record most consecutive pass completions (25) in one game (tied with Philip Rivers)
NFL record highest playoff career completion percentage: 68.1%

Personal life
Foles is a Christian. In 2018, he was working online as a graduate student at Liberty University, earning his master's degree in divinity. He has stated that he plans to become a pastor after his football career, saying, "I want to be a pastor [...] I took a leap of faith last year and signed up to take classes at seminary. I wanted to continue to learn and challenge my faith. It's a challenge because you are writing papers that are biblically correct."

Foles married Tori Moore, who is the younger sister of former NFL tight end Evan Moore, in 2014. Moore and Foles were briefly teammates with the Eagles in 2012. The couple's daughter was born in 2017. Their son was born on June 19, 2020.

While playing for the Eagles, Foles lived in Haddonfield, New Jersey, but put the home up for sale after signing with the Jaguars in 2019. Foles then purchased a home in Ponte Vedra Beach, Florida that same year, but put it up for sale in 2020 after he was traded to the Bears. In 2020, he purchased a home in Glencoe, Illinois for $2.8 million.

In 2018, he wrote his autobiography, Believe It: My Journey of Success, Failure, and Overcoming the Odds, which debuted at No. 5 on the New York Times best-seller list. He donated the proceeds of the book to charity.

Foles also has his own charitable foundation called the Foles Believe Foundation.

References

External links

 
 Indianapolis Colts bio

1989 births
Living people
American Christians
American football quarterbacks
American philanthropists
Arizona Wildcats football players
Chicago Bears players
Indianapolis Colts players
Jacksonville Jaguars players
Kansas City Chiefs players
Liberty University alumni
Michigan State Spartans football players
People from Haddonfield, New Jersey
Philadelphia Eagles players
Players of American football from Austin, Texas
St. Louis Rams players
Super Bowl MVPs
Unconferenced Pro Bowl players
Westlake High School (Texas) alumni